Melodic means relating to or having melody. It may also refer to:
Melodic (magazine), an online magazine
Melodic Records, a record label
Melodics, features of melody